Khabarovsk Krai is a federal subject (a krai) of Russia. It is located in the Russian Far East and is administratively part of the Far Eastern Federal District. The administrative centre of the krai is the city of Khabarovsk, which is home to roughly half of the krai's population and the largest city in the Russian Far East (just ahead of Vladivostok). Khabarovsk Krai is the fourth-largest federal subject by area, and has a population of 1,343,869 as of 2010.

The southern region lies mostly in the basin of the lower Amur River, with the mouth of the river located at Nikolaevsk-on-Amur draining into the Strait of Tartary, which separates Khabarovsk Krai from the island of Sakhalin. The north occupies a vast mountainous area along the coastline of the Sea of Okhotsk, a marginal sea of the Pacific Ocean. Khabarovsk Krai is bordered by Magadan Oblast to the north, Amur Oblast, Jewish Autonomous Oblast and the Sakha Republic to the west, Primorsky Krai to the south, and Sakhalin Oblast to the east.

The population consists of mostly ethnic Russians, but indigenous people of the area are numerous such as the Tungusic peoples (Evenks, Negidals, Ulchs, Nanai, Oroch, Udege) and Amur Nivkhs and Ainu.

Geography
Khabarovsk Krai shares its borders with Magadan Oblast in the north, with the Sakha Republic and Amur Oblast in the west, with the Jewish Autonomous Oblast, China (Heilongjiang), and Primorsky Krai in the south, and is limited by the Sea of Okhotsk in the east. In terms of area, it is the fourth-largest federal subject within Russia. Major islands include Shantar Islands.

Taiga and tundra in the north, swampy forest in the central depression, and deciduous forest in the south are the natural vegetation in the area. The main rivers are the Amur, Amgun, Uda and Tugur, among others. There are also lakes such as Bokon, Bolon, Chukchagir, Evoron, Kizi, Khummi, Orel and Udyl, among others.

Khabarovsk Krai has a severely continental climate with its northern areas being subarctic with stronger maritime summer moderation in the north. In its southerly areas, especially inland, annual swings are extremely strong, with Khabarovsk itself having hot, wet and humid summers which rapidly transforms into severely cold and long winters, where temperatures hardly ever go above freezing. This is because of the influence of the East Asian monsoon in summer and the bitterly cold Siberian High in winter. The second-largest city of Komsomolsk-on-Amur has even more violent temperature swings than Khabarovsk with winter average lows below  but in spite of this avoiding being subarctic because of the significant heat in summer.

There are a number of peninsulas along the krai's extensive coast, the main ones being (north to south) the Lisyansky Peninsula, Nurki Peninsula, Tugurskiy Peninsula and the Tokhareu Peninsula.

The main islands of Khabarovsk Krai (north to south) are Malminskiye Island, the Shantar Islands, Menshikov Island, Reyneke Island (Sea of Okhotsk), Chkalov Island, Baydukov Island and the Chastye Islands. The island of Sakhalin (Russia's largest) is administered separately as Sakhalin Oblast, along with the Kuril Islands.

History
According to various Chinese and Korean records, the southern part of Khabarovsk Krai was originally occupied by one of the five semi-nomadic Shiwei, the Bo Shiwei tribes and the Black Water Mohe tribes living respectively on the west and the east of the Bureya and the Lesser Khingan ranges.

In 1643, Vassili Poyarkov's boats descended the Amur, returning to Yakutsk by the Sea of Okhotsk and the Aldan River, and in 1649–1650 Yerofey Khabarov occupied the banks of the Amur. The resistance of the Chinese, however, obliged the Cossacks to quit their forts, and by the Treaty of Nerchinsk (1689), Russia abandoned its advance into the basin of the river.

Although the Russians were thus deprived of the right to navigate the Amur River, the territorial claim over the lower courses of the river was not settled in the Treaty of Nerchinsk of 1689.  The area between Uda River and Greater Khingan mountain range (i.e. most of Lower Amuria) was left undemarcated and the Sino-Russian border was allowed to fluctuate.

Later in the nineteenth century, Nikolay Muravyov conducted an aggressive policy with China by claiming that the lower reaches of the Amur River belonged to Russia. In 1852, a Russian military expedition under Muravyov explored the Amur, and by 1857 a chain of Russian Cossacks and peasants had been settled along the whole course of the river. In 1858, in the Treaty of Aigun, China recognized the Amur River downstream as far as the Ussuri River as the boundary between Russia and the Qing Empire, and granted Russia free access to the Pacific Ocean.  The Sino-Russian border was later further delineated in the Treaty of Peking of 1860 when the Ussuri Territory (the Maritime Territory), which was previously a joint possession, became Russian.

Khabarovsk Krai was established on 20 October 1938, when the Far Eastern Krai was split into the Khabarovsk and Primorsky Krais. Kamchatka Oblast, which was originally subordinated to the Far Eastern Krai, fell under the Jurisdiction of Khabarovsk Krai, along with its two National Okrugs, Chukotka and Koryak. In 1947, the northern part of Sakhalin was removed from the Krai to join the southern part and form Sakhalin oblast. In 1948, parts of its southwestern territories were removed from the Krai to form Amur Oblast. In 1953, Magadan Oblast was established from the northern parts of the Krai and was given jurisdiction over Chukotka National Okrug which was originally under jurisdiction of Kamchatka oblast. The Krai took its modern form in 1956 when Kamchatka oblast became its own region and took Koryak National Okrug with it. On 24 April 1996 Khabarovsk signed a power-sharing agreement with the federal government, granting it autonomy. This agreement would be abolished on 12 August 2002.

Administrative divisions

Politics

During the Soviet period, the high authority in the oblast was shared between three persons: The first secretary of the Khabarovsk CPSU Committee (who in reality had the biggest authority), the chairman of the oblast Soviet (legislative power), and the Chairman of the oblast Executive Committee (executive power). Since 1991, CPSU lost all the power, and the head of the Oblast administration, and eventually the governor was appointed/elected alongside elected regional parliament.

The Charter of Khabarovsk Krai is the fundamental law of the krai. The Legislative Duma of Khabarovsk Krai is the regional standing legislative (representative) body. The Legislative Duma exercises its authority by passing laws, resolutions, and other legal acts and by supervising the implementation and observance of the laws and other legal acts passed by it. The highest executive body is the Krai Government, which includes territorial executive bodies such as district administrations, committees, and commissions that facilitate development and run the day to day matters of the province. The Krai Administration supports the activities of the Governor who is the highest official and acts as guarantor of the observance of the Charter in accordance with the Constitution of Russia.

On 9 July 2020, the governor of the region, Sergei Furgal, was arrested and flown to Moscow. The 2020 Khabarovsk Krai protests began on 11 July 2020 in support of Furgal.

Economy

Khabarovsk Krai is the most industrialized territory of the Far East of Russia, producing 30% of the total industrial products in the Far Eastern Economic Region.

Heavy industry
The machine construction industry consists primarily of a highly developed military–industrial complex of large-scale aircraft- and shipbuilding enterprises. The Komsomolsk-on-Amur Aircraft Production Association is currently among the krai's most successful enterprises, and for years has been the largest taxpayer of the territory. Other major industries include timber-working and fishing, along with metallurgy in the main cities. Komsomolsk-on-Amur is the iron and steel centre of the Far East; a pipeline from northern Sakhalin supplies the petroleum-refining industry in the city of Khabarovsk. In the Amur basin, there is also some cultivation of wheat and soybeans. The administrative centre, Khabarovsk, is at the junction of the Amur River and the Trans-Siberian Railway.

Mining
The region's mineral resources are relatively underdeveloped. Khabarovsk Krai contains large gold mining operations (Highland Gold, Polus Gold), a major but low-grade copper deposit being explored by IG Integro Group and a world-class tin district which was a major contributor to the Soviet industrial complex and is currently being revitalised by Far Eastern Tin (Festivalnoye mine) and by Sable Tin Resources, which is developing the Sable Tin Deposit (Sobolinoye) large high grade deposit, 25 km from Solnechny town.

Demographics

Population:

Ethnic groups

Births (2009): 17,573 (12.5 per 1000)
Deaths (2009): 19,115 (13.6 per 1000)
Urban Births (2009): 13,612 (12.1 per 1000)
Rural Births (2009):  3,961 (14.5 per 1000)
Urban Deaths (2009): 15,472 (13.7 per 1000)
Rural Deaths (2009):  3,643 (13.3 per 1000)

The birth rate for 2008 is 5.2% higher than that in 2007, and the death rate is 1.4% lower. Birth rate was recorded at 11.6 for 2007 (11.1 for Urban areas and 13.8 for Rural areas) per 1000 people. The death rate was 14.2 in 2007 (14.3 for Urban areas and 14.0 for Rural areas). Rural locations of Khabarovsk Krai had a positive natural growth of population in 2008 (for the first time in the last 16 years).

Settlements

Vital statistics for 2012
Births: 18 324 (13.6 per 1000)
Deaths: 18 169 (13.5 per 1000) 

Total fertility rate: 
2009 – 1.59 | 2010 – 1.56 | 2011 – 1.57 | 2012 – 1.70 | 2013 – 1.74 | 2014 – 1.79 | 2015 – 1.85 | 2016 – 1.79(e)

Religion

According to a 2012 survey, 26.2% of the population of Khabarovsk Krai adheres to the Russian Orthodox Church, 4% are unaffiliated generic Christians, 1% adheres to other Orthodox churches or is a believer in Orthodox Christianity who does not belong to any church, 1% is an adherent of Islam. In addition, 28% of the population declares to be "spiritual but not religious", 23% is atheist, and 16.8% follows other religions or did not give an answer to the question.

Education
There are the following institutions of higher education in Khabarovsk Krai.
Pacific National University
Far Eastern State University of Humanities
Far Eastern State Medical University
Khabarovsk State Academy of Economics and Law
Far Eastern State Transport University
Far Eastern Academy of Government Services
Far Eastern State Physical Education University
Khabarovsk State Institute of Arts and Culture
Komsomolsk-on-Amur State Technical University
Komsomolsk-on-Amur State Pedagogical institute

Sport

Amur Khabarovsk, a professional hockey club of the international Kontinental Hockey League and plays its home games at the Platinum Arena.
FC SKA-Energiya Khabarovsk is a professional association football team playing in the Russian Football National League, the second tier of Russian association football.
SKA-Neftyanik is a professional bandy club which plays in the top-tier Russian Bandy Super League at its own indoor venue Arena Yerofey. In the 2016–17 season the club became Russian champion for the first time.

The city was a host to the 1981 Bandy World Championship as well as to the 2015 Bandy World Championship. For the 2015 games, twenty-one teams originally were expected, which would have been four more than the record-making seventeen from the 2014 tournament, but eventually only sixteen teams came. The A Division of 2018 Bandy World Championship will again be played in Khabarovsk.

Sister relations
 South Gyeongsang Province, South Korea
 Hyōgo Prefecture, Japan

See also
List of Chairmen of the Legislative Duma of Khabarovsk Krai
Tourism in Khabarovsk Krai
Blagodatnoye

References

Notes

Sources

Chaussonnet, Valerie (1995) Native Cultures of Alaska and Siberia. Arctic Studies Center. Washington, D.C. 112p.

External links

—Official website of Khabarovsk Krai
Information concerning the Shiwei tribes and their relationship with the Khitans
—Brief history of Khabaovsk Krai

 
1938 establishments in the Soviet Union
Far Eastern Federal District
Inner Asia
Krais of Russia
Pacific Coast of Russia
Russian Far East
Russian-speaking countries and territories
States and territories established in 1938